El Mourouj is a town and commune in the southern suburbs of Tunis in the Ben Arous Governorate, Tunisia. It became a commune in 1991. It has 118 316 inhabitants as of 2020,  making it the most populous commune in the Ben Arous Governorate.

See also
List of cities in Tunisia

References

Populated places in Ben Arous Governorate
Communes of Tunisia
Tunisia geography articles needing translation from French Wikipedia